"Don't Try to Stop It" is a song released as the second single by British band Roman Holliday. It was released on 10 June 1983 as a 7", 12" and 7" shaped picture disc single. It was the band's biggest hit, peaking at No. 14 in the UK. The song also charted later that year in the U.S. at No. 68.

Track listing
Side A: "Don't Try to Stop It" (2:56) - written by Brian Bonhomme
Side B: "Beat My Time" (1:56) - written by Brian Bonhomme and Steve Lambert

Chart positions

References

1983 singles
1983 songs
Roman Holliday songs
Jive Records singles